Current is the fifth studio album by funk-disco band Heatwave, released in 1982 on the Epic label. It was produced by Barry Blue.

It was the last Heatwave album to feature vocalist Johnnie Wilder Jr. before his departure to pursue a solo career, as well as their final album to feature Rod Temperton as the band's primary songwriter, although he continued to write songs for other musicians until his death in 2016. It was also the final Heatwave album to feature Derek Bramble before his departure to focus on a career in production.

The album also includes guest vocals and harmony work from British Artist and lead vocalist from the group Imagination, Lee John.
Wilder jr requested him and was enough impressed with John, eventually considering him to become a member of Heatwave and somehow taking his own place within the group. Indeed the vocal comparisons were amazing and effective. 

The album was remastered and reissued with bonus tracks in 2010 by Big Break Records.

Track listing

Personnel
Heatwave
Johnnie Wilder, Jr. – vocals
Keith Wilder – vocals
William L. Jones – guitars, vocals
Keith Harrison – keyboards, vocals, synthesizers
Calvin Duke – keyboards, vocals, synthesizers
Derek Bramble – bass
Ernest "Bilbo" Berger – drums
with:
Mel Gaynor - additional drums

Charts

Singles

References

External links
Current at Discogs

1982 albums
Heatwave (band) albums
Epic Records albums